The 2007 European Judo Open Championships were the 4th edition of the European Judo Open Championships, and were held in Warsaw, Poland on 1 December 2007.

The European Judo Open Championships are staged because the open class event had been dropped from the European Judo Championships program from 2004. Unlike the regular European Judo Championships, several competitors from each country are allowed to enter.

Results

References

External links
 

European Championships, Open
Judo Championships
European Judo Open Championships
Judo
Sports competitions in Warsaw
Judo competitions in Poland
2000s in Warsaw
December 2007 sports events in Europe